Friendly Persuasion  is a 1956 American Civil War drama film produced and directed by William Wyler. It stars Gary Cooper, Dorothy McGuire, Anthony Perkins, Richard Eyer, Robert Middleton, Phyllis Love, Mark Richman, Walter Catlett and Marjorie Main. The screenplay by Michael Wilson was adapted from the 1945 novel The Friendly Persuasion by Jessamyn West. The film tells the story of a Quaker family in southern Indiana during the American Civil War and the way the war tests their pacifist beliefs.

The film was originally released with no screenwriting credit because Wilson was on the Hollywood blacklist.  His credit was restored in 1996.

Plot
The film is set in Jennings County, Indiana, in 1862.  Jess Birdwell (Gary Cooper) is a farmer and patriarch of the Birdwell family whose Quaker religion conflicts with his love for the worldly enjoyments of music and horse racing. Jess's wife Eliza, (Dorothy McGuire) a Quaker minister, is deeply religious and steadfast in her refusal to engage in violence. Jess's daughter Mattie (Phyllis Love) wants to remain a Quaker but has fallen in love with dashing cavalry officer Gard Jordan (Peter Mark Richman), a love that is against her mother's wishes. Jess's youngest child "Little" Jess (Richard Eyer) is a feisty child whose comical feud with his mother's pet goose causes her heartache. Jess's elder son Josh (Anthony Perkins) is torn between his hatred of violence and a conviction that to protect his family he must join the home guard and fight the invaders. Enoch (Joel Fluellen), a runaway slave, is a laborer on their farm; his children are still enslaved in the South.

We are introduced to the family via its youngest member, "Little" Jess, who is forever at war with his mother's pet goose. The story begins as an easygoing and humorous tale of Quakers trying to maintain their faith as they go to meeting on First Day (Sunday); contrasted with the Birdwells' neighbor Sam Jordan (Robert Middleton) and other members of the nearby Methodist Church. The mood shifts dramatically when the meeting is interrupted by a Union officer who asks how the Quaker men can stand by when their houses will be looted and their families terrorized by approaching Confederate troops. When confronted with the question of his being afraid to fight, Josh Birdwell responds that it might be the case. His honesty provokes the wrath of Purdy, a Quaker elder who condemns people who don't believe as he does.

The film returns to its lighter tone as the Quakers try to maintain their ways, despite the temptations of amusements at a county fair, and a new organ (which Jess buys over Eliza's opposition), but one is always reminded that the Confederate Army is drawing closer.  On a business trip, Jess acquires a new horse from the widow Hudspeth (Marjorie Main), and is finally able to defeat Sam in their weekly horse race.  One day, Jess is cultivating his fields and notices an immense cloud of smoke on the horizon produced by the burning of buildings. Josh soon arrives and tells them the neighboring community has been reduced to ash and corpses. Josh believes that he must fight, a conviction that threatens to destroy the family. Eliza tells him that by turning his back to their religion he's turning his back on her, but Jess sees things a different way. Josh finds himself on the front line of the battle to stop the advance of the raiders, and only fires his gun when the man next to him is wounded. Meanwhile, Jess is reluctant to fight, only picking up a rifle and riding off towards the fighting when the family horse gallops back to the farm riderless.

When Confederates arrive at the farm, with only Eliza and the younger children present, the family and the farm are saved when Eliza greets them on the porch and welcomes them to take all the food and animals they want and feeds them in their kitchen.  As Jess finds Sam Jordan dying he is bushwhacked by a "Reb". He plays possum and when the Confederate soldier approaches he struggles with him and takes away his gun, but ultimately lets him go free and unhurt. He then finds Josh injured and brings him home. Each member of the family faces the question of whether it is ever right to engage in violence.

Cast

 Gary Cooper as Jess Birdwell
 Dorothy McGuire as Eliza Birdwell
 Anthony Perkins as Joshua "Josh" Birdwell
 Marjorie Main as the widow Hudspeth
 Richard Eyer as Little Jess Birdwell
 Robert Middleton as Sam Jordan
 Phyllis Love as Martha True "Mattie" Birdwell
 Peter Mark Richman as Gardner "Gard" Jordan (credited as Mark Richman)
 Walter Catlett as Professor Quigley
 Richard Hale as Purdy
 Joel Fluellen as Enoch
 Theodore Newton as Major Harvey
 John Smith as Caleb Cope
 Edna Skinner as Opal Hudspeth 
 Marjorie Durant as Pearl Hudspeth
 Frances Farwell as Ruby Hudspeth
Tom London as Farmer on Front Line with Gard (uncredited)
 James Dobson as Rebel soldier (uncredited)

Production
The film was in development for eight years; producer-director William Wyler brought the project to Allied Artists Pictures Corporation (formerly known as Monogram Pictures Corporation) from Paramount; Allied agreed to a $1.5 million budget for what was Wyler's first film in color for a commercial studio.  Wyler had previously shot two documentaries in color in 1944, The Memphis Belle: A Story of a Flying Fortress and the uncredited The Fighting Lady. In 1947, he shot the documentary, Thunderbolt, in color.

The film's shooting location was moved from southern Indiana to a combination of a Republic studio and a San Fernando Valley estate, The film ended up costing over $3 million. The film went over budget to the point that Allied sold the foreign distribution rights to MGM to raise more funds.

Jessamyn West spent a year with the production as both story writer and as technical adviser (credited). Her novel covered a forty-year span of the Birdwell family history and was essentially plotless, so to make the movie effective, she arranged the sequences selected for filming around the Civil War vignette from the novel (altering it significantly for dramatic action) and compressed the whole into a single year, 1862, using the war as the central plot conflict. She created new characters (primarily the Jordans) to fill in for others that had to be deleted, and entirely wrote out Laban, the second eldest son of the novel, substituting a new character, Josh's friend Caleb Cope (John Smith), as a two-scene surrogate. The character Mattie was a composite of the two surviving Birdwell daughters in the novel. Wyler wanted his brother, associate producer Robert Wyler, and author Jessamyn West to receive credit for rewriting the script (also including Wilson), but the WGA ruled that Wilson deserved sole credit for his screenplay.

Cooper expressed initial reservations to West about his character, noting that since in his previous roles "'action seems to come natural to me,' the father should be shown joining the fight. 'There comes a time in a picture of mine when the people watching expect me to do something,' he said. West responded he would do something: 'Refrain. You will furnish your public with the refreshing picture of a strong man refraining.'" Cooper followed West's advice.  He researched his role by attending West's Quaker meeting, East Whittier Friends Church.  Cooper had not wanted to play the father of grown-up children, although he was 55 in real life. He supposedly disliked the finished film and his own performance.

Dorothy McGuire was cast as Cooper's wife after Wyler's choice, Katharine Hepburn, declined. It was Perkins' second film, after his debut in the 1953 film The Actress; his Broadway success with Tea and Sympathy in the meantime tempted him to remain on the stage, though ultimately he decided to do the film.

During production, cameras for the television documentary series Wide Wide World visited the set. According to show host Dave Garroway, it was the first live broadcast from a movie set.

Reception
According to Bosley Crowther, "thee should be pleasured by this film", noting it is "loaded with sweetness and warmth and as much cracker-barrel Americana as has been spread on the screen in some time."  Crowther called Cooper and McGuire "wonderfully spirited and compassionate in their finely complementary roles" and said a "great deal of admiration must go to Anthony Perkins" for making "the older son of the Birdwells a handsome, intense, and chivalrous lad." Variety magazine called it "the simple story of a Quaker family in Indiana back in the 1860s" with "just about everything in the way of comedy and drama, suspense and action"; they also said "figuring importantly in the way the picture plays is Dimitri Tiomkin's conducting of his own score."

The film earned $4 million at the North American box office in 1956.

MGM distributed outside the US and Canada. According to their records the film made $732,000, earning the studio a profit of $582,000.

The film also received mild criticism for certain inaccurate portrayals of Quaker views, such as a misunderstanding that although Quakers disliked programmed music they did value individual original expressions of it; and in meetings, Bible passages are not read verbatim but speakers recite scripture from memory and express its meaning in their own words.   Also, the original screenplay by Michael Wilson was changed significantly in the wake of McCarthyism (and he had taken some liberties himself with the book by Jessamyn West) (see discussion below).

Connection with House Un-American Activities Committee testimony
The movie script was discussed in 1951 by Michael Wilson in his testimony as an "unfriendly witness" at the House Un-American Activities Committee (HUAC), and by director Frank Capra, who was seeking to dissociate himself from Wilson, who was ultimately placed on the Hollywood blacklist.

Capra, who had originally contracted Wilson to write the screenplay just after the war but then dropped the project, said that although he thought Wilson did "a swell job" adapting West's book, the movie was not produced because he felt "it would be a bad time to produce a picture that might be construed as being antiwar. But we let Wilson work on it until he had finished with it."

Wilson told HUAC in 1951, "I feel that this committee might take the credit, or part of it at least, for the fact that The Friendly Persuasion was not produced, in view of the fact that it dealt warmly, in my opinion, with a peace-loving people."

"What happened to Wilson's pacifist script after Capra dropped it," notes film historian Joseph McBride, "reflected the political climate of the Cold War. When William Wyler directed the film for Allied Artists in 1956 as Friendly Persuasion, he had the story changed to make the Quaker youth (played by Anthony Perkins) become a killer. The Quakers in Wyler's version, as Pauline Kael observed, 'are there only to violate their convictions.' But some of the strength of Wilson's conception remains, as in a scene of a crippled Union Army officer respectfully challenging the steadfast Quakers about pacifism in their meeting house."

Ronald Reagan
Friendly Persuasion also became a footnote to world history in the 1980s when United States President Ronald Reagan made a gift of the film to Soviet general secretary Mikhail Gorbachev at one of their five summit meetings, suggesting that he view the film as symbolic of the need to find an alternative to war as a means of resolving differences between peoples.  One Quaker commentator stated: "Friendly Persuasion seems to me to come about as close to truth and fairness as I expect to see Hollywood get in a treatment of Quakerism; I recommend it to every Quaker parent, as projecting images their children ought to see and imitate...I believe (critics have) woefully misjudged the film, on several counts: its place in American cinema, the characters and their roles, its historicity, and, not least, its value as an expression of the Peace Testimony. Here, for perhaps the only time, I think Ronald Reagan was closer to the truth when he commended the film to Gorbachev because it 'shows not the tragedy of war, but the problems of pacifism, the nobility of patriotism as well as the love of peace.'"

Awards and honors
A week before the year's Oscar nominations were announced, the AMPAS Board of Governors introduced a rule denying an Oscar to anyone who refused to talk to a United States congressional committee. The Writers Guild of America protested the new rule and awarded Michael Wilson the Writers Guild of America Award for Best Written American Drama.

At the 29th Academy Awards, Friendly Persuasion was nominated for 6 awards. Michael Wilson's name could not appear on the ballot because he was blacklisted.

The film is recognized by American Film Institute in these lists:
 2004: AFI's 100 Years...100 Songs:
 "Friendly Persuasion (Thee I Love)" – Nominated
 2005: AFI's 100 Years of Film Scores – Nominated

Other adaptations
Another adaptation of the novel was made for television in 1975, starring Richard Kiley, Shirley Knight, Clifton James and Michael O'Keefe.  It was adapted by William P. Wood and directed by Joseph Sargent.  This version also included material from Jessamyn West's sequel novel, Except For Thee and Me.

See also
List of American films of 1956

References

Further reading

 Mirisch, Walter (2008). I Thought We Were Making Movies, Not History. University of Wisconsin Press, Madison, Wisconsin. .

External links

 
 
 
 
 

1956 films
1956 drama films
Allied Artists films
American Civil War films
Anti-war films
Films scored by Dimitri Tiomkin
Films about Christianity
Films about Quakers
Films based on American novels
Films directed by William Wyler
Palme d'Or winners
Metro-Goldwyn-Mayer films
Films with screenplays by Michael Wilson (writer)
Films set in Indiana
Films set in 1862
1950s political drama films
1950s war drama films
1950s English-language films
1950s American films